Novarese is an English and Italian adjective meaning ‘pertaining to Novara’, a city in Piedmont in north-west Italy, or ‘pertaining to the Province of Novara’. As a noun the primary meaning is ‘a person (etc.) from Novara’; it is also an Italian surname. 

It refers to:
Language
Novarese Lombard

Communes in the Province of Novara
Bellinzago Novarese
Bolzano Novarese
Briga Novarese
Castellazzo Novarese
Fara Novarese
Garbagna Novarese

People from Novara
:Category:People from Novara

People named Novarese
Aldo Novarese (1920–1995), Italian font designer
Novarese, a font designed by Aldo Novarese (1978)
Vittorio Nino Novarese (1907–1983), Italian American costume designer in Hollywood